Phyllonorycter aemula is a moth of the family Gracillariidae. It is found in northern Italy and Austria.

Adults are on wing from April to early June and again from July to early August in two generations.

The larvae feed on Ostrya carpinifolia. They mine the leaves of their host plant. They create an upper-surface tentifom mine, practically indistinguishable from the mine of Phyllonorycter coryli.

External links
bladmineerders.nl
Fauna Europaea

aemula
Moths described in 1997
Moths of Europe